Elias Burneti of Bergerac was a Dominican master of theology in the 13th century. According to Kaeppeli, he lectured in Montpellier in the years 1246 through 1247. Later, he became the regent master of the Dominicans in Paris around the years 1248–1256. His works include Excerpta (in the Compendium fratris Erkenfredi) and Compendium Fratris Erkenfridi found in Archivum fratrum praedicatorum.

13th-century births
13th-century deaths
13th-century French Catholic theologians
French Dominicans
Dominican theologians